"Bigger than Us" is a song written by Laurell Barker, Anna-Klara Folin, Jonas Thander, and John Lundvik and performed by Michael Rice. He performed the song at the Eurovision Song Contest 2019, and came in 26th place. The song was chosen on 8 February 2019 at BBC's national selection show Eurovision: You Decide. The song was used as the theme music for the Pride of Britain Awards 2019 and 2020.

At Eurovision

Eurovision: You Decide
The song was chosen at Eurovision: You Decide by the British public and three judges selected by the BBC. After receiving confirmation from the three judges, Michael won the final, beating Jordan Clarke with the song "Freaks" and Kerrie-Anne with the song "Sweet Lies".

The song was originally chosen for Melodifestivalen 2019 to be performed by Swedish singer-songwriter John Lundvik, however Lundvik decided on another song and entered "Bigger than Us" to Eurovision: You Decide as a songwriter.

Lundvik won Melodifestivalen 2019 with his song "Too Late for Love", and competed against "Bigger than Us" in the Eurovision Song Contest 2019. Lundvik finished 5th.

In Tel Aviv
As the United Kingdom is a member of the "Big Five", the song automatically advanced to the grand final, which was held on 18 May 2019 at the Expo Tel Aviv in pavilion 2.

Grand Final
The song finished 26th with a total of 11 points in the Eurovision Song Contest 2019 grand final in Tel Aviv, becoming the 4th act from the United Kingdom to finish last in the grand final.

Critical reception 
Charlotte Runcie of The Daily Telegraph approved of the choice of song for the United Kingdom's Eurovision entry, praising Michael Rice's vocals  and calling the track "a perfectly respectable Eurovision-friendly power ballad with a key change. Nothing special but, crucially, nothing embarrassing."

Charts

References

Eurovision songs of 2019
2019 songs
Eurovision songs of the United Kingdom
2019 singles
Songs written by John Lundvik
2010s ballads
Songs written by Laurell (singer)